Purge is a 2012 Finnish drama film directed by Antti Jokinen, based on the novel of the same name by Sofi Oksanen. The film was selected as the Finnish entry for the Best Foreign Language Oscar at the 85th Academy Awards, but it did not make it to the final shortlist. At the 2013 Jussi Award, the film received eight nominations, including Best Film, Best Direction and Best Costume Design. It won Best Actress for Birn, Best Supporting Actress for Liisi Tandefelt, along with Best Cinematography, Best Sound Design and Best Make-Up Design. Birn was also nominated for the Satellite Award for Best Actress.

Cast
 Laura Birn as Aliide Truu (younger)
 Liisi Tandefelt as Aliide Truu (older)
 Amanda Pilke as Zara
 Peter Franzén as Hans Pekk
 Krista Kosonen as Ingel
 Tommi Korpela as Martin Truu
 Kristjan Sarv as Paša
 Jarmo Mäkinen as Lavrenti
 Jaanika Arum as Katia
 Tomi Salmela as Miliisi
 Panu Vauhkonen as Pitkä miliisi
 Taavi Eelmaa as Jaan Berg

Plot
The exhausted Zara (Amanda Pilke) escapes Russian human traffickers that smuggled her from Russia to Tallinn, the capital of Estonia, under the pretext of working at a hotel. There, beaten and raped, she provides sexual services to gangster clients. After escaping, she goes to the home of an older woman, Aliide (Lisia Tandefelt), where she finds shelter. Two seemingly different women combine not only similar painful experiences, but also blood ties. The girl's experiences mean that the old woman must re-evaluate her life, full of suffering, sacrifice and unrequited love.

See also
 List of submissions to the 85th Academy Awards for Best Foreign Language Film
 List of Finnish submissions for the Academy Award for Best Foreign Language Film

References

External links
 
 

2012 films
2012 drama films
2010s Finnish-language films
Finnish drama films
Films directed by Antti Jokinen
Films about the Soviet Union in the Stalin era
Films about Soviet repression